Liberty Township is one of the thirteen townships of Fairfield County, Ohio, United States. As of the 2010 census the population was 7,916, of whom 4,950 lived in the unincorporated portions of the township.

Geography
Located in the northern part of the county, it borders the following townships:
Harrison Township, Licking County - north
Union Township, Licking County - northeast corner
Walnut Township - east
Pleasant Township - southeast
Greenfield Township - south
Bloom Township - southwest corner
Violet Township - west
Etna Township, Licking County - northwest

The village of Baltimore is located in southeastern Liberty Township.

Name and history
Liberty Township was named for the American ideal of liberty. It is one of twenty-five Liberty Townships statewide.

Government
The township is governed by a three-member board of trustees, who are elected in November of odd-numbered years to a four-year term beginning on the following January 1. Two are elected in the year after the presidential election and one is elected in the year before it. There is also an elected township fiscal officer, who serves a four-year term beginning on April 1 of the year after the election, which is held in November of the year before the presidential election. Vacancies in the fiscal officership or on the board of trustees are filled by the remaining trustees.

References

External links
Liberty Township official website
County website

Townships in Fairfield County, Ohio
Townships in Ohio